Montauban-de-Picardie (literally Montauban of Picardie) is a commune in the Somme department in Hauts-de-France in northern France. Its inhabitants are called Montalbanais in French.

Geography

History

First World War
The village lies on the First World War battlefield of the Somme.  Montauban lay close behind the German front-line and was turned into a fortified strongpoint.  On 1 July 1916, the first day on the Somme, the village was seized by the British 30th Division in one of the few successful British advances of the day. In the village itself there is a monument to the Liverpool and Manchester 'Pals', who, as part of the 30th Division, were the first to reach the village.

Population

See also
Communes of the Somme department

References

World War I sites in France
Communes of Somme (department)